The following is a timeline of the history of the city of Rostock, Germany.

Prior to 18th century

 1218 - Rostock granted Lübeck law city rights by Henry Borwin I, Lord of Mecklenburg.
 1230 -  (church) construction begins (approximate date).
 1252 - Reference to predecessor church of St. Peter's Church.
 1265 
 St. Mary's Church designated as the main parish church.
 Rostock acquires Rostock Heath.
 1270 - Abbey of the Holy Cross, Rostock founded.
 1323 - Warnemünde becomes part of Rostock.
 1358 -  (meeting of Hanseatic League) held in Rostock.
 1362 - Hansetag held in Rostock.
 1378 - Population: 10,785.(de)
 1380 - Public clock installed (approximate date).
 1417 - Hansetag held in Rostock.
 1419 - University of Rostock founded.
 1569 -  (library) founded.
 1588 -  (church) built.
 1677 - .
 1695 - Rostock becomes part of the Duchy of Mecklenburg-Schwerin.

18th-19th centuries
 1702 - Ducal palace built.
 1712 - Rostock "taken by the Swedes."
 1716 - Rostock "taken by the Russians."
 1726 -  (town hall) expanded.
 1786 - Theatre built.
 1788 - Municipal constitution effected.
 1846 -  (newspaper) in publication.
 1880 - Population: 36,967.
 1883 - Vereins für Rostocks Altertümer (history society) founded.
 1890 - Neptun shipyard in business.
 1893 -  (estates hall) built.
 1895 - Stadttheater Rostock opens
 1897 - Rostocker Stadt- und Theaterorchester founded (now Norddeutsche Philharmonie Rostock)

20th century

 1905 - Population: 60,790.
 1913 - Dierkow becomes part of Rostock.(de)
 1919
 Barnstorf, Bartelsdorf, Bramow, Dalwitzhof, Damerow, Kassebohm, and Riekdahl become part of Rostock.(de)
 Population: 67,953.
 1922 - Heinkel aircraft manufactory in business.
 1935 - Population: 104,585.(de)
 1942 - City bombed during World War II.
 1949 - City becomes part of the German Democratic Republic.
 1952 - City becomes seat of newly formed Bezirk Rostock district.
 1953 - Uprising of 1953 in East Germany.
 1954 - Ostseestadion built.
 1955 - Population: 150,004.(de)
 1956 - Rostock Zoo opens.
 1960
 Rostock Port opens.
  and Nienhagen become part of Rostock.(de)
 1965 - F.C. Hansa Rostock (football club) formed.
 1978 -  becomes part of Rostock.(de)
 1990 - City becomes part of the newly formed Mecklenburg-Vorpommern state in the reunited nation of Germany.
 1992 - August: Anti-migrant Rostock-Lichtenhagen riots.
 1994 - Rostock University of Music and Theatre established.
 1995 - Vereins für Rostocker Geschichte (history society) founded.

21st century

 2003 - National Bundesgartenschau (garden show) held in Rostock.
 2005 -  becomes mayor.
 2010 - Population: 202,735.(de)

See also
 Rostock history
 
 
 
 Mecklenburg history (region) (de)
 List of cities in Mecklenburg-Vorpommern (state)
Music in Rostock

References

This article incorporates information from the German Wikipedia.

Bibliography

in English
 
 
 
 
 
  (fulltext)

in German
 
 
  1890-
 
  (dissertation)

External links

  (city archives)
 Items related to Rostock, various dates (via Europeana)
 Items related to Rostock, various dates (via Digital Public Library of America)

Rostock
Rostock
rostock